Bernard ("Ben") Willem Jan Verweij (31 August 1895 in Medan, Sumatra – 14 July 1951 in Amsterdam) was a football (soccer) player from the Netherlands, who represented his home country at two consecutive Summer Olympics, starting in 1920. At his Olympic debut in Antwerp, Belgium he won the bronze medal with the Netherlands national football team, followed by a fourth place four years later in Paris, France.

References

External links
  Dutch Olympic Committee
 

1895 births
1951 deaths
Dutch footballers
Footballers at the 1920 Summer Olympics
Footballers at the 1924 Summer Olympics
Olympic footballers of the Netherlands
Olympic bronze medalists for the Netherlands
Netherlands international footballers
Sportspeople from Medan
Olympic medalists in football
Medalists at the 1920 Summer Olympics
Association football defenders
Dutch people of the Dutch East Indies